A Macabre Legacy is a 1940 Mexican horror film directed by José Bohr and starring Miguel Arenas, Consuelo Frank, and Ramón Armengod.

References

External links
 

1940 films
Mexican horror films
1940 horror films

Mexican black-and-white films
Films directed by José Bohr
1940s Mexican films